The ABC of Communism ( Azbuka Kommunizma) is a book written by Nikolai Bukharin and Yevgeni Preobrazhensky in 1919, during the Russian Civil War. Originally written to convince the proletariat of Russia to support the Bolsheviks, it became "an elementary textbook of communist knowledge". It became the best known and most widely circulated of all pre-Stalinist expositions of Bolshevism and the most widely read political work in Soviet Russia.

Background

In the October Revolution, part of the Russian Revolution, an armed insurrection occurred. It is traditionally dated to 25 October 1917 Julian calendar (7 November 1917 Gregorian calendar). It was the second phase of the overall Russian Revolution of 1917, after the February Revolution of the same year. The October Revolution overthrew the Russian Provisional Government and gave the power to the Soviets dominated by Bolsheviks. It was followed by the Russian Civil War (1917–1922) and the creation of the Soviet Union in 1922.

The revolution was led by the Bolsheviks. Bolshevik armed forces began the takeover of government buildings on 24 October; however 25 October JC was the date when the Winter Palace (the seat of the Provisional government located in Petrograd, the capital of Russia) was captured.

Writing

The ABC of Communism was written during the civil war, and was written to convince the citizens of Russia. In keeping with the period in which it was written, its mood was that of war communism, a militant optimism. It was a statement of Utopian hopes, not Soviet reality.

Association with Bukharin

Preobrazhensky's co-authorship eventually became "half-forgotten", and The ABC soon became inextricably associated with Bukharin, spreading his fame and giving rise to his reputation.

English translations

The first English translation by Patrick Lavin was published by the Marxian Educational Society, of Detroit, Michigan in 1921. A second English translation by Cedar and Eden Paul was published by the Communist Party of Great Britain in 1922.

References 

Communist books
1920 in Russia
Russian Civil War
Russian non-fiction books
1920 non-fiction books